The 2022 Exeter City Council election took place on 5 May 2022 to elect members to Exeter City Council in Devon, England. This was the same day as other local elections in the United Kingdom. 17 of the 39 seats were up for election, one councillor in each of the 13 wards, and 4 by-elections. These wards were last contested in 2018.

Council composition
The Labour Party have a majority of 17 on the council. The Conservatives are the main opposition with 6 councillors. The Liberal Democrat, Green and Independent Councillors formed a "Progressive Group" following the 2019 elections.

In these elections, 10 wards up for election currently have a Labour councillor (Alphington; Exwick; Heavitree; Mincinglake & Whipton; Newtown & St Leonards; Pennsylvania; Pinhoe; Priory; St Davids; and St Thomas), 2 have Conservative councillors (St Loyes; and Topsham) and 1 has a Liberal Democrat councillor (Duryard and St James). 

In addition to these seats, four by-elections have so far been announced in the Exwick, Heavitree, Pennsylvania and Priory wards. In order to retain their overall majority on the councillor, Labour need to win at least six seats.

Outgoing Councillors 
Each ward has the following outgoing councillor:

Alphington 

 Cllr. Bob Foale (Labour): Portfolio Holder for Transformation & Environment; First elected in 2016.

Duryard and St James 

 Cllr. Kevin Mitchell (Liberal Democrat): Liberal Democrat group leader; Progressive Group leader; First elected in 2003.

Exwick 

 Cllr. Rachel Sutton (Labour): Portfolio Holder for Net Zero Exeter 2030; First elected in 2010.
 A by-election will be held due to the resignation of Cllr. Ollie Pearson.

Heavitree 

 Cllr. Greg Sheldon (Labour); First elected in 1996.
 A by-election will be held due to the resignation of Cllr. Chris Buswell.

Mincinglake and Whipton 

 Cllr. Naima Allcock (Labour); First elected in 2021.

Newtown and St Leonards 

 Cllr. Matthew Vizard (Labour); First elected in 2017.

Pennsylvania 

 Cllr. Jane Begley (Labour); First elected in 2018.
 A by-election will be held due to the death of Cllr. Ian Quance.

Pinhoe 

 Cllr. Duncan Wood (Labour); First elected in 2016.

Priory 

 Cllr. Tony Wardle (Labour); First elected in 2008.
 A by-election will be held due to the resignation of Cllr. Alys Martin.

St Davids 

 Cllr. Luke Sills (Labour); First elected in 2016.

St Loyes 

 Cllr. Peter Holland (Conservative); First elected in 2014.

St Thomas 

 Cllr. Laura Wright (Labour): Deputy Leader and Portfolio Holder for Council Housing Development and Services; First elected in 2018.

Topsham 

 Cllr. Keith Sparkes (Conservative); First elected in 2019.

Results Summary

Results By Ward 
The full list of candidates was published on 6th April. An asterisk (*) denotes an incumbent councillor seeking re-election.

Jane Begley was an incumbent councillor for the Pennsylvania ward.

References

Exeter
Exeter City Council elections
2020s in Exeter
2020s in Devon